{{DISPLAYTITLE:C24H30O8}}
The molecular formula C24H30O8 (molar mass: 446.49 g/mol) may refer to:

 Desaspidin
 Estrone glucuronide
 Filicin, also known as Flavaspidic acid BB
 Merochlorophaeic acid, a depside

Molecular formulas